George "Graeme" Weideman (born 6 November 1934), a pharmacist, and the older brother of Collingwood footballer Murray Weideman, was a Victorian politician, who represented Frankston for the Liberal Party from 1976 to 1982 and 1992 to 1996, and Frankston South from 1985 to 1992. He served as Minister for Tourism and Assistant Minister for Health from 1981 until the fall of the Liberal Government in 1982.

References

Members of the Victorian Legislative Assembly
1934 births
Living people
Liberal Party of Australia members of the Parliament of Victoria
Australian pharmacists